Alexia Queyrel (born 3 June 1999) is a French snowboarder. She competed in the 2022 Winter Olympics, in Women's Snowboard Cross.

She competed at the 2019 FIS World Junior Championships,  2018–19 FIS Snowboard World Cup, 2020–21 FIS Snowboard World Cup,  and  2021–22 FIS Snowboard World Cup.

References

External links 

 Alexia Queyrel of France in action during the FIS Freestyle Ski Cross...Photo by Nisse Schmidt/Agence Zoom - Getty Images

1999 births
French female snowboarders
Living people
Snowboarders at the 2022 Winter Olympics
Olympic snowboarders of France
21st-century French women